Hassan Mustafa Osama Nasr ( Ḥassan Muṣṭafā Usāmah Naṣr) (born 18 March 1963), also known as Abu Omar, is an Egyptian cleric. In 2003, he was living in Milan, Italy, from where he was kidnapped and tortured in Egypt. This "Imam rapito affair" prompted a series of investigations in Italy, culminating in the criminal convictions (in absentia) of 22 CIA operatives, a U.S. Air Force colonel, and two Italian accomplices, as well as Nasr, himself.

Early life
He is a member of al-Gama'a al-Islamiyya, an Islamic organisation that was formerly dedicated to the overthrow of the Egyptian government; the group has committed to peaceful means following the coup d'état that toppled Mohamed Morsi. The group has been linked to the murder of Anwar Sadat in 1981 and a terrorist campaign in the 1990s that culminated in the November 1997 Luxor massacre. As a result, it is considered a terrorist organization by the United States and European Union. After the Egyptians declared the group illegal,  Nasr sought asylum in Italy. During the 1990s he fought in Bosnia.

Abduction by the CIA

On 17 February 2003, Nasr was abducted by CIA agents as he walked to his mosque in Milan for noon prayers, thus becoming an effective ghost detainee. He was later transported to a prison in Egypt where, he states, he was tortured.

In April 2004, while his incarceration had been downgraded to house arrest, Nasr placed several phone calls from Egypt to his family and friends. He told them he had been rendered into the hands of Egypt's SSI at Tora Prison, twenty miles south of Cairo.  He said he had been subjected to various depredations, tortured by beating and electric shocks to the genitals, raped, and eventually had lost hearing in one ear.  At the time of the calls he had been released on the orders of an Egyptian judge because of lack of evidence. Shortly after those calls were made he was re-arrested and placed back in prison.

Nasr's case has been qualified by Swiss senator Dick Marty as a "perfect example of extraordinary rendition", and in Italy prompted a series of investigations and intrigues within the Italian intelligence community and criminal justice system collectively referred to as the Imam Rapito (or "kidnapped Imam") affair in the Italian press.

In February 2016, the European Court of Human Rights condemned Italy over this affair and ordered Italy to pay €115,000 (£90,000; $127,000) in damages and expenses to Nasr and his wife, Nabila Ghali.

Convictions of CIA agents and others
On 4 November 2009, an Italian judge convicted in absentia 22 CIA agents, a U.S. Air Force (USAF) colonel and two Italian secret agents of the kidnap. Eight other American and Italian defendants were acquitted.

Former Milan CIA station chief, Robert Seldon Lady, received an eight-year prison sentence. USAF Lieutenant Colonel Joseph L. Romano, at the time of the conviction commander of the 37th Training Group of the 37th Training Wing, and 21 of the American defendants received five-year prison sentences.  Those convicted were also ordered to each pay 1 million Euros to Nasr and 500,000 Euros to Nasr's wife.

In 2010, leaked diplomatic documents revealed the efforts the United States used in an attempt to stop Italy from indicting the CIA agents, and that Italian Prime Minister Silvio Berlusconi assured US Secretary of Defense Robert Gates that he was "working hard to resolve the situation" but that the Italy's judicial system was "dominated by leftists".

In July 2013, Robert Seldon Lady was initially detained in Panama at the request of Italian authorities, but then released and allowed to board a flight to the United States.

In January 2016, former C.I.A. agent Sabrina De Sousa, one of the agents convicted in Italy, was ordered by Portugal to be extradited to Italy, although that order will be appealed. She was briefly detained at the Lisbon airport in October 2015, and her passport was confiscated pending a court review of the European arrest warrant issued for her arrest. She has disclaimed any involvement in the affair and has been working to clear her name, including writing a memoir about her activities. Her appeal was denied on April 11, 2016.  After being detained in Portugal in February 2017 and about to be deported to Italy, she was pardoned by the Italian president and released on 28 February 2017.

Release in February 2007

On 11 February 2007, Nasr's lawyer Montasser el-Zayat confirmed that his client had been released and was now back with his family. After four years of detention, an Egyptian court ruled that his imprisonment was "unfounded."

Conviction in Italy
In December 2013, Nasr was convicted in absentia of terrorism by an Italian court for offenses before his abduction. Egypt had not responded to Italian requests to extradite or even interview Nasr for the trial. Nasr remains living in Egypt and is unlikely to be sent to Italy to serve out his sentence.

See also

Sabrina De Sousa
Human rights in Egypt
Imam rapito affair
Khalid El-Masri
Returnees from Albania
Mark Zaid
Montasser el-Zayat

References

External links

A lot more information on Abu Omar and controversy in Italy
Rendition Cindy Sheehan? CIA Fugitive From Italy Justice Is Located
CIA Ruse Is Said to Have Damaged Probe in Milan: Italy Allegedly Misled on Cleric's Abduction, Washington Post, 6 December 2005
A Cleric's Journey, Washington Post, 6 December 2005
Ex-Aviano officer won't comment on alleged abduction, Stars and Stripes, 10 December 2006
Italy indicts 31 linked to CIA rendition case, International Herald Tribune, 15 February 2007
Amnesty International interview.

People subject to extraordinary rendition by the United States
Egyptian imams
Egyptian Islamists
Sunni Islamists
History of Milan
1963 births
Living people
Egyptian Sunni Muslims
Egyptian prisoners and detainees
Prisoners and detainees of Egypt
Egyptian refugees
Egyptian torture victims
Egyptian expatriates in Italy
Italian Sunni Muslims
Kidnapped Egyptian people
Missing person cases in Egypt

eo:Hassan Mustafa Osama Nasr